is a dam in Nishiaizu, Fukushima Prefecture, Japan, completed in 1958.

References 

Dams in Fukushima Prefecture
Dams completed in 1958